In geometry, the Bilinski dodecahedron is a convex polyhedron with twelve congruent golden rhombus faces. It has the same topology but a different geometry than the face-transitive rhombic dodecahedron. It is a parallelohedron.

History
This shape appears in a  book by John Lodge Cowley, labeled as the dodecarhombus. Bilinski himself called it the rhombic dodecahedron of the second kind. Bilinski's discovery corrected a -year-old omission in Evgraf Fedorov's classification of convex polyhedra with congruent rhombic faces.

Definition and properties

Definition
The Bilinski dodecahedron is formed by gluing together twelve congruent golden rhombi. These are rhombi whose diagonals are in the golden ratio:

The graph of the resulting polyhedron is isomorphic to the graph of the rhombic dodecahedron, but the faces are oriented differently: one pair of opposite rhombi has their long and short diagonals reversed, relatively to the orientation of the corresponding rhombi in the rhombic dodecahedron.

Symmetry
Because of its reversal, the Bilinski dodecahedron has a lower order of symmetry; its symmetry group is that of a rectangular cuboid:  of order  This is a subgroup of octahedral symmetry; its elements are: three -fold symmetry axes, three symmetry planes (which are also the axial planes of this solid), and a center of inversion symmetry.

Vertices
Like the rhombic dodecahedron, the Bilinski dodecahedron has eight vertices of degree  and six of degree . It has two apices on the vertical axis, and four vertices on each axial plane. But due to the reversal, its non-apical vertices form two squares (red and green) and one rectangle (blue), and its fourteen vertices in all are of four different kinds:
two degree- apices surrounded by four acute face angles (vertical-axis vertices, black in st figure);
four degree- vertices surrounded by three acute and one obtuse face angles (horizontal-axial-plane vertices, blue in st figure);
four degree- vertices surrounded by three obtuse face angles (one vertical-axial-plane vertices, red in st figure);
four degree- vertices surrounded by two obtuse and one acute face angles (other vertical-axial-plane vertices, green in st figure).

Faces
The supplementary internal angles of a golden rhombus are:
acute angle:

obtuse angle:

The faces of the Bilinski dodecahedron are twelve congruent golden rhombi; but due to the reversal, they are of three different kinds:
eight apical faces with all four kinds of vertices,
two side faces with alternate blue and red vertices (front and back in st figure),
two side faces with alternating blue and green vertices (left and right in st figure).
(See also the figure with edges and front faces colored.)

Edges
The  edges of the Bilinski dodecahedron have the same length; but due to the reversal, they are of four different kinds:
four apical edges with black and red vertices (in st figure),
four apical edges with black and green vertices (in st figure),
eight side edges with blue and red vertices (in st figure),
eight side edges with blue and green vertices (in st figure).
(See also the figure with edges and front faces colored.)

Cartesian coordinates, lengths
The vertices of the Bilinski dodecahedron with thickness  can have Cartesian coordinates:

where  is the golden ratio.

The Bilinski dodecahedron of this size has:
length of longest body diagonal (i.e. lying on opposite black degree- vertices):

length of shorter body diagonals (i.e. lying on opposite blue degree- vertices):

edge length:

In families of polyhedra
The Bilinski dodecahedron is a parallelohedron; thus it is also a space-filling polyhedron, and a zonohedron.

Relation to rhombic dodecahedron
In a  paper, H. S. M. Coxeter claimed that the Bilinski dodecahedron could be obtained by an affine transformation from the rhombic dodecahedron, but this is false. For:

In the rhombic dodecahedron: every long body diagonal (i.e. lying on opposite degree- vertices) is parallel to the short diagonals of four faces.

In the Bilinski dodecahedron: the longest body diagonal (i.e. lying on opposite black degree- vertices) is parallel to the short diagonals of two faces, and to the long diagonals of two other faces; the shorter body diagonals (i.e. lying on opposite blue degree- vertices) are not parallel to the diagonal of any face.

In any affine transformation of the rhombic dodecahedron: every long body diagonal (i.e. lying on opposite degree- vertices) remains parallel to four face diagonals, and these remain of the same (new) length.

Zonohedra with golden rhombic faces

The Bilinski dodecahedron can be formed from the rhombic triacontahedron (another zonohedron, with thirty congruent golden rhombic faces) by removing or collapsing two zones or belts of ten and eight golden rhombic faces with parallel edges. Removing only one zone of ten faces produces the rhombic icosahedron. Removing three zones of ten, eight, and six faces produces a golden rhombohedron. Thus removing a zone of six faces from the Bilinski dodecahedron produces a golden rhombohedron. The Bilinski dodecahedron can be dissected into four golden rhombohedra, two of each type.

The vertices of the zonohedra with golden rhombic faces can be computed by linear combinations of two to six generating edge vectors with coefficients  or  A belt  means a belt representing  directional vectors, and containing  coparallel edges with same length. The Bilinski dodecahedron has four belts of six coparallel edges.

These zonohedra are projection envelopes of the hypercubes, with -dimensional projection basis, with golden ratio. For  the specific basis is:
 
 
 

For  the basis is the same with the -th column removed. For  the -th and -th columns are removed.

References

External links
 VRML model, George W. Hart: 
 animation and coordinates, David I. McCooey: 
 A new Rhombic Dodecahedron from Croatia!, YouTube video by Matt Parker

Zonohedra
Golden ratio